Polly Neate CBE is chief executive of Shelter, a British homelessness and housing charity that campaigns for tenant rights. She was recognised for her work in the 2020 New Year Honours list.

Early life and education
Neate was born in 1966. Her mother, Patricia Mulligan, is a psychotherapist and her father, Francis Neate, is a lawyer and former president of the International Bar Association. One of her brothers is novelist Patrick Neate.

She attended Gumley House Convent School, Isleworth and St Paul's Girls' School, London, before going to University of Bristol, where she took a Bachelor of Arts in English. She then took a postgraduate diploma in journalism at City, University of London.

After her diploma she was a freelancer whose work was published in The Guardian and the New Statesman before becoming the editor of Community Care magazine.

Career in the Charity Sector
Neate moved into charity work in 2005 when she became Executive Director of External Relations at Action for Children until 2013.
She also sat as an independent member of the Labour working group on children's policy in 2008–09.

Neate became chief executive for the Women's Aid in 2013 where she helped secure legislation to criminalise coercive and controlling behaviour. In this role, she also sat as an independent member of the Labour working group on domestic violence policy, and as an independent member of the government's National Oversight Group on Domestic Violence.

Neate became CEO of Shelter in 2017.

She also sits on the board of Agenda, the alliance for women and girls at risk, and is a trustee of the Young Women's Trust.

In her charity roles, she writes opinion pieces on housing, women's rights, leadership, and wider social justice issues.

She won Best CEO on Twitter in 2019's Social CEOs awards.

Personal life
She is married to Hugh Thornbery CBE.

References

External links 
Twitter: @pollyn1 

Instagram: pollyatshelter

Year of birth missing (living people)
Living people
Women human rights activists
Date of birth missing (living people)
Commanders of the Order of the British Empire
British nonprofit chief executives